Leslie Marie Osborne (born May 27, 1983) is a retired American soccer defensive midfielder who last played for the Chicago Red Stars in the NWSL in 2013. She is a former member of the United States women's national soccer team and previously played for FC Gold Pride and the Boston Breakers in the WPS.  She announced her retirement as a player in March 2014.

Early life
Born in Milwaukee, Wisconsin, Osborne grew up in Brookfield, Wisconsin and attended Catholic Memorial High School in Waukesha, Wisconsin.

Santa Clara University

Osborne played soccer at Santa Clara University in Santa Clara, California.  As a freshman, she was a key member of the Santa Clara team that won the 2001 NCAA Women's Soccer Championship.  As a senior in 2004, she was a semifinalist for the Hermann Trophy and won the Honda Sports Award as the nation's outstanding collegiate female player.

Playing career

Club

FC Gold Pride
In 2009, she played for the FC Gold Pride, in the inaugural season of the Women's Professional Soccer (WPS) league.

Boston Breakers
In 2010, Osborne was made a free agent and signed with the Boston Breakers.

When the WPS suspended operations in early 2012 and later folded, Osborne continued with the Breakers as they moved into the Women's Premier Soccer League Elite. She played a key role in securing investors for the team in both the WPS and WPSL Elite.

Chicago Red Stars
In 2013, she joined the Chicago Red Stars in the new National Women's Soccer League.

On March 11, 2014 she announced her retirement from professional soccer.

International
Osborne was a member of U.S. national youth teams in 2002 and 2003, and earned her first cap with the senior national team on January 30, 2004 against Sweden.  After sitting out the first U.S. game of the 2007 FIFA Women's World Cup in favor of Shannon Boxx, she played all 90 minutes in all five remaining matches. During the 4-0 semifinal loss to Brazil, Osborne scored an own goal in an attempt to clear a corner kick.

In May 2008, Osborne tore her ACL before the 2008 Olympics, which caused her to miss the Beijing games. She took nearly a year to rehab the knee injury, causing her to miss several national team games and lose her regular starting position on the national team.

International goals

Coaching career
Osborne was an assistant coach for the Santa Clara women's team for several years.

Personal life
Osborne is married to Ricky Lewis, with whom she has three daughters.

Sponsor
Osborne has a primary sponsorship with German sportswear company, Puma.

References

Match reports

External links
 
 Fox Sports profile
  US Soccer player profile
 Leslie Osborne official website
 Chicago Red Stars player profile
 Boston Breakers player profile
  Graham Hayes, "Osborne provides unparalleled depth in midfield", ESPN.com, September 7, 2007
  Leslie Osborne's World Cup blog (Santa Clara University)
 

1983 births
Living people
Association footballers' wives and girlfriends
United States women's international soccer players
Santa Clara Broncos women's soccer players
FC Gold Pride players
Boston Breakers players
Sportspeople from Milwaukee
Soccer players from Milwaukee
American women's soccer players
Women's Premier Soccer League Elite players
National Women's Soccer League players
Chicago Red Stars players
Women's Professional Soccer players
2007 FIFA Women's World Cup players
Women's association football midfielders
Sports businesswomen
American women business executives
American business executives
Women association football commentators
California Storm players
Women's Premier Soccer League players
Association football commentators
American soccer commentators
Chicago Cobras players
USL W-League (1995–2015) players